The 2006 Heartland Championship was an amateur rugby union competition in New Zealand. It was the first season of the competition, a direct successor to the Second and Third Divisions of the country's former rugby competition, the National Provincial Championship. The competition featured 12 teams, divided into two pools of six teams.

At the end of Round 1, the top three teams from each pool contested the Meads Cup, and the bottom three from each pool contested the Lochore Cup. Competition points from Round 1 carried over to Round 2, in which each team in each cup competition played a round-robin with the three teams it did not play in Round 1. At the end of Round 2, the top four teams in each cup competition entered a single-elimination playoff for the Meads and Lochore Cups. The cups were named after Colin Meads and Brian Lochore, both legendary players for the country's national team, the All Blacks.

The inaugural Meads Cup champion was Wairarapa Bush, and Poverty Bay lifted the first Lochore Cup.

Round 1

Standings

The top three places in each pool, highlighted in blue, advanced to the Meads Cup. The remaining teams entered the Lochore Cup.

Pool A

Pool B

<small>
Pos     = Table Position
Pld     = Played
W       = Win (Worth 4 points)
D       = Draw (Worth 2 points)
L       = Loss (Worth 0 points)
For     = For (Total points scored)
Against = Against (Total points scored against)
+/-     = Points difference (The total of For minus Against points)
BP      = Bonus Point (Teams can score additional bonus points by certain scenarios. 1 Bonus point will be awarded to any team that scores 4 tries or more regardless of win/loss/draw. A bonus point will be awarded to the losing side if the loss is by 7 points or less. It is possible to receive 2 (two) bonus points in a loss.)
Pts = Progressive points tally

Fixtures and results

Week 1

Week 2

Week 3

Week 4

Week 5

|- bgcolor="#CCCCFF"
| Pool
| Date
| Time
| Home team
| Score
| Away team
| Score
|- bgcolor="#FFFFFF"
| A
| 16 September
| 14:30
| Mid Canterbury (1 BP)
| 19
| style="background:silver" | Wairarapa Bush
| style="background:silver" | 20
|- bgcolor="#FFFFFF"
| A
| 16 September
| 14:30
| style="background:silver" | North Otago (1 BP)
| style="background:silver" | 50
| East Coast
| 12
|- bgcolor="#FFFFFF"
| A
| 16 September
| 14:35
| West Coast (1 BP)
| 16
| style="background:silver" | Buller
| style="background:silver" | 17
|- bgcolor="#FFFFFF"
| B
| 16 September
| 14:30
| style="background:silver" | South Canterbury
| style="background:silver" | 14
| King Country (1 BP)
| 10
|- bgcolor="#FFFFFF"
| B
| 16 September
| 14:30
| style="background:silver" | Thames Valley
| style="background:silver" | 22
| Horowhenua-Kapiti (1 BP)
| 21
|- bgcolor="#FFFFFF"
| B
| 16 September
| 14:30
| Poverty Bay (1 BP)
| 30
| style="background:silver" | Wanganui (1 BP)
| style="background:silver" | 41

Round 2

Standings

Meads Cup Pool
{| class="wikitable"
|-border=1 cellpadding=5 cellspacing=
! bgcolor="#efefef" width="20"|Pos
! bgcolor="#efefef" width="185"|Name
! bgcolor="#efefef" width="20"|Pld
! bgcolor="#efefef" width="20"|W
! bgcolor="#efefef" width"20"|D
! bgcolor="#efefef" width"20"|L
! bgcolor="#efefef" width="20"|F
! bgcolor="#efefef" width="20"|A
! bgcolor="#efefef" width="20"|+/-
! bgcolor="#efefef" width="20"|BP
! bgcolor="#efefef" width="20"|Pts
|- align=center
|align=left|1
|align="left"|Wanganui
|8||7||1||0||123||67||+56||5||35
|- align=center
|align=left|2
|align="left"|Wairarapa Bush
|8||7||0||1||100||56||+44||3||31
|- align=center
|align=left|3
|align="left"|North Otago
|8||6||0||2||132||80||+52||7||31
|- align=center
|align=left|4
|align="left"|Mid Canterbury
|8||4||0||4||63||80||-17||3||19
|- align=center
|align=left|5
|align="left"|South Canterbury
|8||3||0||5||28||102||-74||2||14
|- align=center
|align=left|6
|align="left"|Horowhenua-Kapiti
|8||2||1||5||65||126||-61||3||13
|}

Lochore Cup Pool
{| class="wikitable"
|-border=1 cellpadding=5 cellspacing=
! bgcolor="#efefef" width="20"|Pos
! bgcolor="#efefef" width="185"|Name
! bgcolor="#efefef" width="20"|Pld
! bgcolor="#efefef" width="20"|W
! bgcolor="#efefef" width"20"|D
! bgcolor="#efefef" width"20"|L
! bgcolor="#efefef" width="20"|F
! bgcolor="#efefef" width="20"|A
! bgcolor="#efefef" width="20"|+/-
! bgcolor="#efefef" width="20"|BP
! bgcolor="#efefef" width="20"|Pts
|- align=center
|align=left|1
|align="left"|Poverty Bay
|8||5||0||3||120||54||+66||4||24
|- align=center
|align=left|2
|align="left"|Thames Valley
|8||4||0||4||107||51||+56||5||21
|- align=center
|align=left|3
|align="left"|King Country
|8||3||2||3||81||40||+41||4||20
|- align=center
|align=left|4
|align="left"|Buller
|8||3||0||5||46||57||-11||2||14
|- align=center
|align=left|5
|align="left"|East Coast
|8||1||0||7||44||130||-86||2||6
|- align=center
|align=left|6
|align="left"|West Coast
|8||1||0||7||55||121||-66||2||6
|}

Fixtures and results

Week 6

|- bgcolor="#CCCCFF"
| Pool
| Date
| Time
| Home team
| Score
| Away team
| Score
|- bgcolor="#FFFFFF"
| MC
| 23 September
| 14:30
| style="background:silver" | Wanganui (1 BP)
| style="background:silver" | 46
| Mid Canterbury
| 8
|- bgcolor="#FFFFFF"
| MC
| 23 September
| 14:30
| style="background:silver" | Wairarapa Bush
| style="background:silver" | 31
| Horowhenua-Kapiti
| 11
|- bgcolor="#FFFFFF"
| MC
| 23 September
| 14:30
| style="background:silver" | North Otago (1 BP)
| style="background:silver" | 36
| South Canterbury
| 6
|- bgcolor="#FFFFFF"
| LC
| 23 September
| 14:30
| style="background:silver" | Thames Valley (1 BP)
| style="background:silver" | 51
| West Coast
| 16
|- bgcolor="#FFFFFF"
| LC
| 23 September
| 14:30
| style="background:silver" | Poverty Bay 
| style="background:silver" | 33
| East Coast
| 15
|- bgcolor="#FFFFFF"
| LC
| 23 September
| 14:30
| Buller (1 BP)
| 6
| style="background:silver" | King Country
| style="background:silver" | 11

Week 7

|- bgcolor="#CCCCFF"
| Pool
| Date
| Time
| Home team
| Score
| Away team
| Score
|- bgcolor="#FFFFFF"
| MC
| 30 September
| 14:30
| style="background:silver" | Mid Canterbury (1 BP)
| style="background:silver" | 36
| Horowhenua-Kapiti (1 BP)
| 29
|- bgcolor="#FFFFFF"
| MC
| 30 September
| 14:30
| North Otago (1 BP)
| 37
| style="background:silver" | Wanganui (1 BP)
| style="background:silver" | 49
|- bgcolor="#FFFFFF"
| MC
| 30 September
| 14:30
| style="background:silver" | Wairarapa Bush (1 BP)
| style="background:silver" | 47
| South Canterbury
| 17
|- bgcolor="#FFFFFF"
| LC
| 30 September
| 14:30
| East Coast
| 17
| style="background:silver" | Thames Valley (1 BP)
| style="background:silver" | 40
|- bgcolor="#FFFFFF"
| LC
| 30 September
| 14:30
| Buller
| 22
| style="background:silver" | Poverty Bay (1 BP)
| style="background:silver" | 30
|- bgcolor="#FFFFFF"
| MC
| 30 September
| 14:30
| West Coast
| 22
| style="background:silver" | King Country (1 BP)
| style="background:silver" | 32

Week 8

|- bgcolor="#CCCCFF"
| Pool
| Date
| Time
| Home team
| Score
| Away team
| Score
|- bgcolor="#FFFFFF"
| MC
| 7 October
| 14:30
| style="background:silver" | Wanganui 
| style="background:silver" | 28
| Wairarapa Bush (1 BP)
| 22
|- bgcolor="#FFFFFF"
| MC
| 7 October
| 14:30
| Horowhenua-Kapiti 
| 25
| style="background:silver" | North Otago (1 BP)
| style="background:silver" | 59
|- bgcolor="#FFFFFF"
| MC
| 7 October
| 14:30
| South Canterbury 
| 5
| style="background:silver" | Mid Canterbury
| style="background:silver" | 19
|- bgcolor="#FFFFFF"
| LC
| 7 October
| 14:00
| Thames Valley (1 BP)
| 16
| style="background:silver" | Buller
| style="background:silver" | 18
|- bgcolor="#FFFFFF"
| LC
| 7 October
| 14:30
| style="background:silver" | Poverty Bay (1 BP) 
| style="background:silver" | 57
| West Coast
| 17
|- bgcolor="#FFFFFF"
| LC
| 7 October
| 14:30
| style="background:silver" | King Country (1 BP) 
| style="background:silver" | 38
| East Coast
| 12

Semifinals

Fixtures and results

Meads Cup

|- bgcolor="#CCCCFF"
| Date
| Time
| Home team
| Score
| Away team
| Score
|- bgcolor="#FFFFFF"
| 14 October
| 16:35
| style="background:silver" | Wanganui
| style="background:silver" | 30
| Mid Canterbury
| 17
|- bgcolor="#FFFFFF"
| 14 October
| 14:30
| style="background:silver" | Wairarapa Bush
| style="background:silver" | 25
| North Otago
| 19

Lochore Cup

|- bgcolor="#CCCCFF"
| Date
| Time
| Home team
| Score
| Away team
| Score
|- bgcolor="#FFFFFF"
| 14 October
| 14:30
| style="background:silver" | Poverty Bay
| style="background:silver" | 36
| Buller
| 10
|- bgcolor="#FFFFFF"
| 14 October
| 14:00
| Thames Valley
| 15
! style="background:silver" | King Country
! style="background:silver" | 17

Finals

Fixtures and results

Meads Cup

|- bgcolor="#CCCCFF"
| Date
| Time
| Home team
| Score
| Away team
| Score
|- bgcolor="#FFFFFF"
| 21 October
| 16:30
| Wanganui 
| 14
| style="background:silver" | Wairarapa Bush
| style="background:silver" | 16

Lochore Cup

|- bgcolor="#CCCCFF"
| Date
| Time
| Home team
| Score
| Away team
| Score
|- bgcolor="#FFFFFF"
| 21 October
| 14:15
| style="background:silver" | Poverty Bay 
| style="background:silver" | 46
| King Country
| 34

References

External links
2006 Heartland Championship Draw
Heartland draw and results on Allblacks.com

3
New Zealand 2